The 1946–47 Texas Longhorns men's basketball team represented the University of Texas at Austin in intercollegiate basketball competition during the 1946–47 season. The Longhorns were led by eighth-year head coach and former Longhorn basketball consensus first-team All-American Jack Gray. The team finished the season with a 26–2 overall record, for the highest win percentage in all of college basketball for the season, and a 12–0 record in Southwest Conference play to win the SWC championship. Texas advanced to the NCAA tournament for the third time, recording its second Final Four appearance.

Schedule and results

References 

Texas Longhorns men's basketball seasons
Texas
NCAA Division I men's basketball tournament Final Four seasons
Texas
Texas Longhorns Basketball Team
Texas Longhorns Basketball Team